Sarıdibek is a village in the Adaklı District, Bingöl Province, Turkey. The village is populated by Kurds of the Hormek tribe and had a population of 57 in 2021.

The hamlets of Çakır, Çiçeklim, Dağlıca, Gözecik and Koşar mezrası are attached to the village.

References 

Villages in Adaklı District
Kurdish settlements in Bingöl Province